Ali Al-Muhanadi (Arabic:علي المهندي) (born 11 September 1993) is a Qatari footballer. He currently plays for Al-Markhiya as a winger.

External links

References

Qatari footballers
1993 births
Living people
Qatar SC players
Al-Khor SC players
Al-Markhiya SC players
Qatar Stars League players
Qatari Second Division players
Association football midfielders